The Irish Senior Open is the Irish stop on men's golf's European Senior Tour. It was played from 1997 to 2010 and was contested at several different courses around Ireland. From 1997 to 2007 it was sponsored by Allied Irish Banks. In 2021, the tournament was revived as the Irish Legends and was presented by Paul McGinley's foundation.

Winners

External links
Coverage on the European Seniors Tour's official site

European Senior Tour events
Golf tournaments in the Republic of Ireland
Recurring sporting events established in 1997
Recurring sporting events disestablished in 2010
1997 establishments in Ireland
2010 disestablishments in Ireland
International Sports Promotion Society